A. laevis  may refer to:
 Acaulospora laevis, a fungus species
 Acronychia laevis, a rainforest plant species growing in eastern Australia
 Afrixalus laevis, a frog species found in Africa
 Aipysurus laevis, a venomous sea snake species found mainly in the Indo-Pacific
 Alsodes laevis, a frog species endemic to Chile
 Amelanchier laevis, the smooth shadbush or Allegheny serviceberry, a small tree species
 Anisoptera laevis, a plant species found in Brunei, Indonesia, Malaysia and Singapore

See also
 List of Latin and Greek words commonly used in systematic names#L